Lowland loosestrife is a common name for several plants and may refer to:

Lysimachia hybrida, a widespread North American plant
Lythrum flagellare, endemic to Florida